Joseph McNaull (born June 23, 1972) is an American former professional basketball player who also has Polish citizenship. Born in Miami, Florida, he is 6'10" and played at center. Represented Polish national basketball team for Eurobasket qualification. With Śląsk Wrocław he won 4 consecutive Polish league titles. With Norrköping Dolphins he won a Swedish league title in 2010.

References

Long Beach State Beach men's basketball players
San Diego State Aztecs men's basketball players
1972 births
Living people
Naturalized citizens of Poland
American expatriate basketball people in France
American expatriate basketball people in Poland
American expatriate basketball people in Spain
American expatriate basketball people in Sweden
American men's basketball players
CB Breogán players
Asseco Gdynia players
Basketball players from Miami
Centers (basketball)
Norrköping Dolphins players
Śląsk Wrocław basketball players